Mete Çelik (born 8 October 1996) is a Turkish footballer who plays for Ankara Keçiörengücü.

References

External links
 
 
 

1996 births
People from Langenau
Footballers from Baden-Württemberg
German people of Turkish descent
Living people
Turkish footballers
Turkey youth international footballers
Association football fullbacks
Association football defenders
German footballers
VfB Stuttgart II players
Ankaraspor footballers
Menemenspor footballers
Ankara Keçiörengücü S.K. footballers
3. Liga players
Regionalliga players
TFF First League players